Cashing In is a Canadian television comedy-drama series, which aired on APTN from 2009 to 2014. Set in the fictional First Nations community of Stonewalker, the series revolved around the staff and customers of an indigenous-owned casino.

The show starred Eric Schweig as casino owner Matthew Tommy, Karen Holness as his assistant Liz McKendra, Glen Gould as property magnate John Eagle, and Wesley French as Matthew's son Justin. Supporting cast members included Nancy Sorel, Sarah Podemski, Kyle Nobess, Tina Keeper and Stephen Eric McIntyre.

The series was produced by Buffalo Gal Pictures.

References

External links

2000s Canadian comedy-drama television series
2010s Canadian comedy-drama television series
2009 Canadian television series debuts
2014 Canadian television series endings
Aboriginal Peoples Television Network original programming
Television shows filmed in Winnipeg
First Nations television series